Blind Justice may refer to:

 Blind justice (concept), a legal concept regarding the neutrality of the dispensing of justice

Books 

 Blind Justice (novel), a 1995 novel by Bruce Alexander
 Blind Justice (comics), is a fictional character appearing in American comic books published by Marvel Comics.
 Blind Justice, a story featuring Batman, and first appearance of fictional character Henri Ducard, written by Sam Hamm for Detective Comics #589-#600 (March 1989-May 1989)

Films 

 Blind Justice (1916 film), a Danish film
 Blind Justice (1934 film), a British film
 Blind Justice (1961 film)
 Blind Justice (1986 film)
 Blind Justice (1988 film)
 Blind Justice (1994 film), an American HBO TV-movie starring Armand Assante

TV series 

 Blind Justice (1988 BBC TV series), created by Helena Kennedy 
 Blind Justice (TV series), a 2005 ABC television series

See also 
 Justice
 Lady Justice, goddess and personification of justice, often portrayed as wearing a blindfold